The 1989 Sacramento State Hornets football team represented California State University, Sacramento as a member of the Western Football Conference (WFC) during the 1989 NCAA Division II football season. Led by 12th-year head coach Bob Mattos, Sacramento State compiled an overall record of 5–4 with a mark of 2–3 in conference play, placing fifth in the WFC. The team was outscored by its opponents 236 to 202 for the season. The Hornets played home games at Hornet Stadium in Sacramento, California.

Schedule

References

Sacramento State
Sacramento State Hornets football seasons
Sacramento State Hornets football